José Rafael Revenga y Hernández (24 November 1786 – 9 March 1852) was a minister of foreign affairs of Gran Colombia (1819–1821). 

He was the  2nd Secretary of Foreign Affairs of Colombia starting 17 September 1825, appointed by Francisco de Paula Santander y Omaña. He was the Minister of Foreign Affairs of Venezuela from 8 March 1849 until 23 April 1849 under president José Tadeo Monagas. He was the Minister of Finance in 1849.

Legacy
José Rafael Revenga support the Venezuela independence cause from the outset April 1810, entered its ranks in August 1810 as the Ministry of Foreign Affairs. In March 1811 he was sent by the first Venezuelan Congress, along with Telésforo de Orea, on a mission to the United States government. Despite meeting with President James Madison and the Secretary of State, the mission did not reach anything concrete after the fall of the First Republic in July 1812. From the United States, Revenga traveled to Cartagena de Indias, where from 1815 he served as secretary of Simon Bolívar. Following the reconquest of New Granada by the royalists, he decided to return to the United States in 1816 where he collaborated with Francisco Javier Mina in his plans to make a liberating expedition to Mexico; but he did not accompany him in this, preferring to return to Venezuela in 1818. The same year he contributed foundation of the weekly Correo del Orinoco in Angostura. 

In 1822 as Minister Plenipotentiary of Gran Colombia to Britain, negotiated Great Britain's recognition of Gran Colombia as an independent country. Complained to the British government at the direction of Simón Bolívar about the presence of British settlers in  territory claimed by Venezuela: "The colonists of Demerara and Berbice have usurped a large portion of land, which according to recent treaties between Spain and Holland, belongs to our country at the west of Essequibo River. It is absolutely essential that these settlers be put under the jurisdiction and obedience to our laws, or be withdrawn to their former possessions." 
He is buried in the National Pantheon of Venezuela.

See also
List of Ministers of Foreign Affairs of Venezuela

References

External links

 

 

Foreign ministers of Colombia
Ambassadors of Colombia to the United Kingdom
1786 births
1852 deaths
People from Aragua
Venezuelan Ministers of Foreign Affairs
Finance ministers of Venezuela